Rashaan Fernandes (born 29 July 1998) is a Dutch footballer who plays as a forward for Go Ahead Eagles in the Eredivisie.

Career
In July 2019, Fernandes went on trial with Go Ahead Eagles, but wasn't offered a contract. Fernandes did eventually get the chance to play for Go Ahead Eagles, as his contract came to an end at Telstar after the 2021–22 season and he signed a 3-year contract with Go Ahead Eagles.

Personal life
Born in the Netherlands, Fernandes is of Surinamese descent.

References

External links
Rashaan Fernandes at EuroSport

1998 births
Living people
FC Twente players
SC Telstar players
Go Ahead Eagles players
Eredivisie players
Eerste Divisie players
Dutch footballers
Netherlands youth international footballers
Dutch sportspeople of Surinamese descent
Association football forwards
Footballers from Rotterdam